The Ashrafiyat Sahnaya chemical attack took place in Ashrafiyat Sahnaya, Syria, on 25 August 2013. A group of Syrian Army soldiers were struck by an object containing sarin.

Background
On the day of the attack fighting occurred between Syrian Army soldiers and opposition fighters in Ashrafiyat Sahnaya, as part of the Rif Dimashq offensive (March–August 2013). At around 18:00, the rebels started to throw objects with a catapult.

Attack
Around 20:00 an object filled with sarin was thrown at a group of five Syrian Army soldiers. The object landed 10–15 meters from them, and released a badly smelling gas. The five soldiers were immediately taken to a field medical point where they were treated with injections, eye droplets and oxygen. They were then transported to Martyr Yusuf Al Azmah Military Hospital for emergency care, where medical personnel took blood samples. The blood samples tested positive for sarin.

Aftermath
The United Nations Mission to Investigate Alleged Uses of Chemical Weapons in the Syrian Arab Republic collected evidence "that suggests that chemical weapons were used in Ashrafia Sahnaya" "on a small scale against soldiers", but said they lacked primary information on the delivery system.

The victims were interviewed by the U.N. mission five days after the incident.

See also 
 Khan al-Assal chemical attack
 Ghouta chemical attack
 Jobar sarin attack

References

Chemical weapons attacks
Military operations of the Syrian civil war involving chemical weapons
Rif Dimashq Governorate in the Syrian civil war